Dodogaster is a genus of braconid wasps. It currently consists only of the type species Dodogaster grangeri, found in Africa and also described by Rousse & Gupta, 2013

References

Microgastrinae
Braconidae genera